The Hambantota International Port is a deep water port in Hambantota, Sri Lanka, which has been leased to China on a 99-year lease. Opened in 2010, it is Sri Lanka's second largest port, after  Colombo. In 2020, the port handled 1.8 million tonnes of cargo.

Construction of the port commenced in January 2008. In 2016, it reported an operating profit of US$1.81 million but was considered economically unviable. As debt repayment got difficult, the newly-elected government decided to privatise an 80% stake of the port to raise foreign exchange in order to repay maturing sovereign bonds unrelated to the port. Of the two bidding companies, China Merchants Port was chosen, which was to pay US$1.12 billion to Sri Lanka and spend additional amounts to develop the port into full operation.

In July 2017, the agreement was signed, but CMPort was allowed a 70% stake. Simultaneously a 99-year lease on the port was granted to CMPort.

History 

In modern times, the port is expected to become part of the "21st Century Maritime Silk Road" (the maritime part of China's Belt and Road Initiative) that runs from the Chinese coast via the Suez Canal to the Mediterranean, and from there to the Upper Adriatic region of Trieste with its rail connections to Central and Eastern Europe.

Location and plans 
Sri Lanka is situated along the key shipping route between the Malacca Straits and the Suez Canal, which links Asia and Europe. An estimated 36,000 ships, including 4,500 oil tankers, use the route annually. However the only major port in Sri Lanka, the Port of Colombo, is catered towards container handling and is unable to provide facilities for port related industries and services.  Therefore, a new port was proposed near the city of Hambantota, which has a natural harbor and is located on the southern tip of Sri Lanka close to international shipping routes.

A new port will help relieve pressure on the Colombo port, and also provide services to ships that normally take three-and-a-half-day detours from their shipping lanes to receive these services, including refueling, maintenance, logistics and buying provisions and medical supplies.

Ideas to build a port in Hambantota have been in the air for over three decades, but no movement was made. A shipping enthusiast called Ariya Wickramanayake carried out a study with his own funds and presented to Mahinda Rajapaksa when he was a minister. The proposal was however shot down by the bureaucracy and it got moving again after Rajapaksa was elected the President. 

The United National Front had pledged to build a seaport in Hambantota on winning the 2001 Sri Lankan parliamentary election. After victory, Sri Lankan Prime Minister Ranil Wickremesinghe announced the "Regaining Sri Lanka" economic development programme in 2002, which identified the Hambantota port for development. The plan also included building a refinery, petrochemical industries, a coal powered thermal power station, and a desalination plant.

According to Sri Lankan economist Saman Kelegama, the Sri Lankan government initially invited India to build the port project but bureaucratic and procedural delays ultimately prompted Sri Lanka to turn to China.

Feasibility studies

SNC-Lavalin 

In June 2002, SNC-Lavalin was invited to carry out a feasibility study, with partial funding from the Canadian International Development Agency. The study concluded that the port could be feasibly developed in three stages costing US$1.7 billion. It recommended that a joint venture between the Sri Lanka Ports Authority and a private consortium be set up to undertake the project under a build–own–operate–transfer arrangement.

A steering committee of the Ports Authority rejected the report as being non-comprehensive and lacking in primary research. The recommendation to begin container operations at the first stage of the project was criticised for ignoring the potential impact on existing operations at the Port of Colombo.

Ramboll 
The plan to build the port was revived by Mahinda Rajapaksa, a native of Hambantota, after he was elected president in 2005. A second feasibility study was commissioned to Ramboll. Ramboll reached conclusions similar to those from SNC-Lavalin.

The Ramboll study recommended the Hambantota port to bring in revenue by allowing the transport of non-containerised cargo before expanding the port to handle cargo containers, to allow the Port of Colombo to reach its capacity.

Construction 
The port was constructed in two phases.

First phase 
The Chinese government financed phase one with a 15-year commercial loan from Exim Bank of China, which lent US$306.7 million (85 per cent of the estimated total cost) while the Sri Lanka Ports Authority bore the rest. The loan carried a 6.3 per cent interest rate and specified China Harbour Engineering Company, a state-owned enterprise, as the construction contractor.

A US$76.5-million bunker terminal with an initial capacity of 500,000 tonnes was built, fitted with LPG tanks and fuel tanks for ships and aircraft, as well as ship repair, shipbuilding and crew change facilities.

The first phase of the port was inaugurated on 18 November 2010 by President Mahinda Rajapaksa, whom the port was named after. The accompanying ceremony cost ₨ 18.8 million and was subject to an investigation by the Government for corruption. Jetliner, a Sri Lanka Navy passenger ship that sailed from Galle was ceremonially berthed and workers unloaded the first consignment of international cargo from Myanmar from the vessel Seruwila.

Second phase 
The second phase of construction began in 2012 after The Exim Bank of China loaned another US$757 million with an interest rate of 2 per cent. The loan agreement allowed China Harbour Engineering and China Merchants Port to jointly operate the terminal and take a 65 per cent stake in the port for 35 years. After 35 years, the ownership of the port will be returned to the Sri Lanka Ports Authority.

Operation under Chinese joint venture 
In 2016, the Sri Lanka Ports Authority had to repay ₨9 billion in construction fees for the Hambantota port, which, by the end of the year, accumulated a loss of ₨46.7 billion. After the National United Front won the 2015 presidential and parliamentary elections, Prime Minister Ranil Wickremesinghe visited China to solve the issue. Then, the ports authority rescinded the agreement with the Chinese operators of the port and replaced it with a concession agreement signed in 2017.

Under the 2017 agreement, Sri Lanka Ports Authority created Hambantota International Port Group (HIPG), which then became a joint venture after China Merchant Ports bought an 85 per cent stake in HIPG as part of the Chinese company's US$1.12 billion investment into the port. The agreement will expire 99 years after its effective date and allows HIPG to develop and operate the Hambantota port exclusively. The agreement also stipulated the creation of a 15,000-acre special economic zone.

The money from China Merchant Ports was used to strengthen Sri Lanka's US-dollar reserves and pay short-term foreign debts unrelated to the port.

The agreement was delayed for several months because of concerns that the port could be used for military purposes and opposition from trade unions and political parties, which called it a sellout of Sri Lankan national assets to China. Former president Rajapaksa criticised the plan, including the special economic zone, and warned of social unrest if the plans were carried through. India and the United States raised concerns that Chinese control of the Hambantota port could harm their interests in the Indian Ocean. The large Chinese loans, the inability of the Sri Lankan government to service the loans, and the subsequent 99-year Chinese lease on the port have also led to accusations that China was practising debt-trap diplomacy, the factual accuracy of which is disputed. In September 2021, Sri Lankan geopolitics analyst Asanga Abeyagoonasekera described of a 'Strategic-trap diplomacy'.

In February 2021, the Sri Lankan foreign minister Dinesh Gunawardena said the lease of the Hambantota port to China was a mistake made by the previous government, after reports that Colombo was revisiting the agreement.

The HIPG introduced automation, represented the port in several international summits and signed agreements with international shipping companies. As a result the nine-storey administration building of the port, the Hambantota Maritime Centre became 95 per cent occupied and in just one year under the new management the port made a 136 per cent increase in the volume of ro-ro vessels handled and even diversified its services to include other port-related activities such as container handling, general cargo, passenger, bunkering, bulk terminal, gas and project cargo.

In July 2018, the Sri Lankan government announced it would relocate its naval base at Galle to Hambantota.

Facilities

In 2020 Sinopec's Sri Lankan unit invested in bunkering and invested in a $5m in a tanker which flies the Sri Lankan flag. Lanka Marine Services (LMS) partnered with Sinopec in supplying very low sulphur fuel oil (VLSFO).

A $550 million tax-free port zone was set up outside the port. In 2016 a 15,000 acre SEZ project was announced with 5,000 acres from Hambantota and the rest from Monaragala, Embilipitiya and Matara.

In July 2019 LAUGFS Holdings opened a Liquid Petroleum Gas (LPG) terminal which imports butane and propane and produces LPG to sell domestically or re-export. Within the first 14 months, it had handled 413,000 metric tonnes of LPG, 60% of which was exported to Bangladesh, Maldives and India. As of September the terminal handles around 15 – 20 ship calls per month and it is expected to increase up to 30.

State-owned Litro Gas operates LPG terminal with a storage capacity of 3,000 metric tonnes.

Port operations
The SLPA had decided to divert all vehicle shipments to the Ruhunu Magampura Mahinda Rajapaksa International port from May 31, 2012, as a measure to relieve the congestion at Sri Lanka's main port Colombo Harbour.
On June 6, 2012, Ruhunu Magampura Mahinda Rajapaksa International Port officially started transshipment operations with the N4K FRICIA ship from Japan containing 15 vehicles and the Ellison Sun with 1000 vehicles from Chennai Harbour, India.

Japanese, South Korean and Indian car makers have begun transshipping increasing numbers of vehicles through the port. In the first nine months of 2014, the number of vehicles handled at Hambantota crossed the 100,000 mark, up more than 300% compared to the same period in 2013, with the number of ship calls more than doubling to 161. The biggest user of the port is the Hyundai plant near Chennai while Tata and Maruti vehicles also come from Mumbai. In future, all Hyundai vehicles made in South Korea, China and India will be transshipped through Hambantota 15,000 units a month once more yard space is available.

In April 2017, making a historic landmark in Sri Lanka, the world's largest pure car and truck carrier (PCTC), the MV Hoegh Trigger, arrived on her maiden call at the Port of Hambantota.

Incidents
In December 2016, a mob of workers who were believed to be backed by Rajapaksa loyalists protesting against the leasing of the port vandalised the port and took several ships hostage. The 13-storey building was taken over by the strikers and was flooded, and CCTV systems and electricity were shut down. However, swift action by the Navy rescued the ships, and repair of damaged infrastructure began. The government accused leaders of the strike of protesting against the SEZ that happened in Hambantota, led by members of the Nil Balakaya, an organization created by Namal Rajapaksa; the government accused them of being political appointees. As a result, a shipping line also sent a bill of $400,000 in damages to the port authority. The government and Navy Commander Vice Admiral Ravindra Wijegunaratne were heavily criticized by civil activists and the media over an assault on a journalist during the protest.

Notes

See also
 Belt and Road Initiative
 List of ports in Sri Lanka
 Mattala Rajapaksa International Airport
 Southern Expressway (Sri Lanka)
Treaty ports

References

Bibliography

External links 

 
 Hambantota Port Development Project - about.lk 
 Conceptual video of completed port

China–Sri Lanka relations
Concession territories
Ports and harbours of Sri Lanka
2010 establishments in Sri Lanka
Buildings and structures in Hambantota